Marinicella pacifica is a Gram-negative, strictly aerobic, rod-shaped and non-motile bacterium from the genus of Marinicella which has been isolated from seawater from the South Pacific Gyre from the Pacific Ocean.

References

External links
Type strain of Marinicella pacifica at BacDive -  the Bacterial Diversity Metadatabase

Alteromonadales
Bacteria described in 2016